Crime in Poland is combated by the Polish police and other government agencies. Poland's homicide rate is among the lowest in Europe and the country ranks 25th in Global Peace Index in 2022.

Crime by type

Murder

In 2011, Poland had a murder rate of 1.2 per 100,000 population. There were a total of 449 murders in Poland in 2011. In 2014 Poland had a murder rate of 0.7 per 100,000. There were a total 283 murders in Poland in 2014. In 2020, the homicide rate in Poland was 0.71 per 100,000 similar to recent years and down from a high of 2.4 per 100,000 in 1993 and 1994.

Organized crime
The most well known of the Polish organized crime groups in the 1990s were the so-called Pruszkow and the Wolomin gangs. 

Polish organized crime emerged in the 1990s, when the traditional criminal underworld became better organised and due to rising corruption. Organized crime groups were well known (1992) for operating sophisticated car theft-rings, as well as for their involvement in drug trafficking (the main drug being amphetamine) and weapon trafficking.

The Pruszków mafia was an organized criminal group that emerged from the Warsaw suburb of Pruszków in the beginning of the 1990s. The group is known for being involved in large car-theft rings, drug trafficking (including cocaine, heroin, hashish and amphetamine), kidnapping, extortion, weapon trafficking (including AK-47's) and murder. Even though law enforcement dealt a severe blow to the Pruszków mafia, it is alleged that Pruszków-based gangs, with or without notice from their former leaders, have regained their strength in recent years and have begun setting up their car-theft rings and connections with Colombian drug cartels again.

A similar organized crime group known as the Wołomin mafia from Wołomin near Warsaw, with whom they fought bloody turf wars, was crushed by the Polish police in cooperation with the German police in a spectacular raid on a highway between Konin and Poznan in September 2011.

Corruption 

Poland ranked 30th in the 175 country listing the Corruption Perception Index for 2015. It is the tenth successive year in which Poland's score and ranking has improved in the Index.

Polish cities most affected by crime

Crime dynamics

While local organized crime in Poland existed during the interwar period, it has mostly developed since the fall of communism (late 1980s/1990s) with the introduction of free market system in Poland and the lessening of the police (milicja) power.

Crime in Poland is lower than in many countries of Europe. 

Newer studies (2009) report that the crime victimisation rate in Poland is constantly decreasing, and in 2008 Poland was at a low end of 25 among the 36 European countries listed. A 2004 report on security concerns of European Union residents indicated that the Polish public (along with that of Greece) are the most afraid of crime, a finding which does not correlate with the actual crime threat.

See also
 Football hooliganism in Poland
 Polish Mob (in United States)

References

Further reading
Emil Pływaczewski, Organised Crime in Poland: Its Development from 'Real Socialism' to Present Times in Cyrille Fijnaut, Letizia Paoli, Organised Crime in Europe: Concepts, Patterns and Control Policies in the European Union and Beyond, Springer, 2004, 
S. P. Bartnicki, CRIME IN POLAND: TRENDS, REGIONAL PATTERNS AND NEIGHBOURHOOD AWARENESS, in David J. Evans, David T. Herbert, The Geography of Crime, Routledge, 1989, 
 Carl B. Klockars, Sanja Kutnjak Ivkovic, Maria R. Haberfeld, Crime in Contemporary Poland in The Contours of Police Integrity, Sage Publications Inc, 2003, 
Organized crime in poland: how to combat it?, European Journal on Criminal Policy and Research, Volume 2, Numbers 2-3 / June, 1994, 0928-1371 (Print) 1572-9869 (Online)